The giant oceanic manta ray, giant manta ray, or oceanic manta ray (Mobula birostris) is a species of ray in the family Mobulidae, and the largest type of ray in the world. It is circumglobal and is typically found in tropical and subtropical waters, but can also be found in temperate waters.  Until 2017, the species was classified in the genus Manta, along with the smaller reef manta ray (Mobula alfredi).  DNA testing revealed that both species are more closely related to  rays of the genus Mobula than previously thought.  As a result, the giant manta was renamed as Mobula birostris to reflect the new classification.

Description

It is dorsoventrally flattened and has large, triangular pectoral fins on either side of the disc. 
At the front, it has a pair of cephalic fins which are forward extensions of the pectoral fins. These can be rolled up in a spiral for swimming or can be flared out to channel water into the large, forward-pointing, rectangular mouth when the animal is feeding. 
The teeth are in a band of 18 rows and are restricted to the central part of the lower jaw.
The eyes and the spiracles are on the side of the head behind the cephalic fins, and the gill slits are on the ventral (under) surface. 
It has a small dorsal fin and the tail is long and whip-like. The manta ray does not have a spiny tail as do the closely related devil rays (Mobula spp.) but has a knob-like bulge at the base of its tail.

The skin is smooth with a scattering of conical and ridge-shaped tubercles. The colouring of the dorsal (upper) surface is black, dark brown, or steely blue, sometimes with a few pale spots and usually with a pale edge. The ventral surface is white, sometimes with dark spots and blotches. The markings can often be used to recognise individual fish.
Mobula birostris is similar in appearance to Mobula alfredi and the two species may be confused as their distribution overlaps. However, there are distinguishing features.

Physical distinctions between oceanic manta ray and reef manta ray 

The oceanic manta ray is larger than the reef manta ray, 4 to 5 metres in average against 3 to 3.5 metres. However, if the observed rays are young, their size can easily bring confusion. Only the colour pattern remains an effective way to distinguish them. The reef manta ray has a dark dorsal side with usually two lighter areas on top of the head, looking like a nuanced gradient of its dark dominating back coloration and whitish to greyish, the longitudinal separation between these two lighter areas forms a kind of "Y". While for the oceanic manta ray, the dorsal surface is deep dark and the two white areas are well marked without gradient effect. The line of separation between these two white areas form meanwhile a "T".

Difference can also be made by their ventral coloration, the reef manta ray has a white belly with often spots between the branchial gill slits and other spots spread across trailing edge of pectoral fins and abdominal region. The oceanic manta ray has also a white ventral coloration with spots clustered around lower region of its abdomen. Its cephalic fins, inside of its mouth and its gill slits are often black.

Distribution and habitat
The giant oceanic manta ray has a widespread distribution in tropical and temperate waters worldwide. In the Northern Hemisphere, it has been recorded as far north as southern California and New Jersey in the United States, Aomori Prefecture in Japan, the Sinai Peninsula in Egypt, and the Azores in the northern Atlantic. In the Southern Hemisphere, it occurs as far south as Peru, Uruguay, South Africa, and New Zealand.

It is an ocean-going species and spends most of its life far from land, travelling with the currents and migrating to areas where upwellings of nutrient-rich water increase the availability of zooplankton. The oceanic manta ray is often found in association with offshore oceanic islands.

Evolution

Captivity

There are few public aquariums with giant manta ray in captivity. Since 2009, captive manta rays have been classified as Ꮇ. alfredi and there have been no facilities to display Ꮇ. birostris for some time.

Since late 2018 it has been exhibited at Nausicaä Centre National de la Mer in France and Okinawa Churaumi Aquarium in Japan. 
There are also reports that they were kept at the Marine Life Park, part of the Resorts World Sentosa in Singapore.

Biology

When traveling in deep water, the giant oceanic manta ray swims steadily in a straight line, while further inshore it usually basks or swims idly around. Mantas may travel alone or in groups of up to 50 and sometimes associate with other fish species, as well as sea birds and marine mammals. About 27% of their diet is based on  filter feeding, and they will migrate to coastlines to hunt varying types of zooplankton such as copepods, mysids, shrimp, euphausiids, decapod larvae, and on occasion, varying sizes of fish. When foraging, it usually swims slowly around its prey, herding the planktonic creatures into a tight group before speeding through the bunched-up organisms with its mouth open wide. While feeding, the cephalic fins are spread to channel the prey into its mouth and the small particles are sifted from the water by the tissue between the gill arches. As many as 50 individual fish may gather at a single, plankton-rich feeding site. Research published in 2016 proved about 73% of their diet is mesopelagic (deep water) sources including fish. Earlier assumptions about exclusively filter feeding were based on surface observations.

The giant oceanic manta ray sometimes visits a cleaning station on a coral reef, where it adopts a near-stationary position for several minutes while cleaner fish consume bits of loose skin and external parasites. Such visits occur most frequently at high tide. It does not rest on the seabed as do many flat fish, as it needs to swim continuously to channel water over its gills for respiration.

When a female is becoming receptive, one or several males may swim along behind her in a "train". During copulation, one of the males grips the female's pectoral fin with his teeth and they continue to swim with their ventral surfaces in contact. He inserts his claspers into her cloaca and these form a tube through which the sperm is pumped. The pair remains coupled together for several minutes before going their own way.

The fertilized eggs develop within the female's oviduct. At first, they are enclosed in an egg case and the developing embryos feed on the yolk. After the egg hatches, the pup remains in the oviduct and receives nourishment from a milky secretion. As it does not have a placental connection with its mother, the pup relies on buccal pumping to obtain oxygen. The brood size is usually one but occasionally two embryos develop simultaneously. The gestation period is thought to be 12–13 months. It is expelled from the oviduct, usually near the coast, and it remains in a shallow-water environment for a few years while it grows.

Brain size and intelligence

The oceanic manta has one of the largest brains, weighing up to 200 g (five to ten times larger than a whale shark brain), and the largest brain-to-mass ratio of any fish. It heats the blood going to its brain and is one of the few animals (land or sea) that might pass the mirror test, seemingly exhibiting self-awareness.

Status and threats

Natural predation

Because of its large size and velocity in case of danger (24 km/h escape speed), the oceanic manta ray has very few natural predators that could be fatal to it. Only large sharks and dolphins, such as  the tiger shark (Galeocerdo cuvier), the great hammerhead shark (Sphyrna mokarran), the bullshark (Carcharhinus leucas), the false killer whale (Pseudorca crassidens), and the killer whale (Orcinus orca), are capable of preying on the ray. Nonlethal shark bites are very common occurrences, with a vast majority of adult individuals bearing the scars of at least one attack.

Fishery

The oceanic manta ray is considered to be endangered by the IUCN’s Red List of Endangered Species because its population has decreased drastically over the last twenty years due to overfishing. Because M. birostris feeds in shallow waters, there is a higher risk of them getting caught in fishing equipment, especially in surface drift gillnets and bottom set nets. Whatever the type of fishing (artisanal, targeted or bycatch), the impact on a population which has a low fecundity rate, a long gestation period with mainly a single pup at a time, and a late sexual maturity can only be seriously detrimental to a species that cannot compensate for the losses over several decades.

Since the 1970s, fishing for manta rays has been significantly boosted by the price of their gill rakers on the traditional Chinese medicine market. In Chinese culture, they are the main ingredient in a tonic that is marketed to increase immune system function and blood circulation, though there is no strong evidence that the tonic is actually beneficial to health. For this reason and others, gill rakers are sold at relatively high prices – up to $400 per kilogram – and are sold under the trade name pengyusai. In June 2018 the New Zealand Department of Conservation classified the giant oceanic manta ray as "Data Deficient" with the qualifier "Threatened Overseas" under the New Zealand Threat Classification System.

Pollution 
There is also the threat of microplastics in the diets of oceanic manta rays. A 2019 study in Indonesia's Coral Triangle was performed to determine if the filter-feeding megafauna of the area were accidentally ingesting microplastics, which can be eaten by filter-feeders either directly (by ingesting layers of plastic polymers that float on the surface of the water in feeding areas) or indirectly (by eating plankton that previously ate microplastics). The results of the study provided ample evidence that filter feeders, such as oceanic manta rays, that lived in the area were regularly consuming microplastics. Though it was also proven via stool samples that some of the plastic simply passed through the digestive systems of manta rays, the discovery is a concern because microplastics create sinks for persistent organic pollutants like dichloro-diphenyl-trichloroethanes (DDTs) and polycyclic aromatic hydrocarbons (PAHs). Manta rays that consume microplastics harboring these pollutants can suffer from a variety of health effects that range from short-term negative effects such as the reduction of bacteria in their guts, or long-term effects including pollutant-induced weakening of the population's reproductive fitness over future generations, which could negatively affect population levels of the rays in the future.

M. birostris are also victims of bioaccumulation in certain regions. There has been at least one study that has shown how heavy metals such as As, Cd, and Hg can be introduced to the marine environment via pollution and can travel up the trophic chain. For example, there was a study in Ghana that involved the testing of tissue samples from six M. birostris carcasses; all of them showed evidence of high concentrations of As and Hg (about 0.155–2.321 μg/g and 0.001–0.006 μg/g respectively). While the sample size was not the most ideal, it is a first step towards further understanding the true amount of bioaccumulation that M. birostris undergoes due to human pollution. These high levels of metals can cause harm to the people who consume M. birostris, and could also cause health problems for the M. birostris species itself. More studies need to be done in order to further confirm the negative health effects of bioaccumulation on M. birostris.

Climate change combined with rising temperatures, are projected to cause a 10% decrease in the global population of phytoplankton with a potential 50% decrease in tropical areas. With these reductions could come a decrease in M. birostris populations.

See also

 Threatened rays

References

External links

 

Articles containing video clips
giant oceanic manta ray
giant oceanic manta ray
Pantropical fish
Fish of the Dominican Republic
Taxa named by Johann Julius Walbaum
Vulnerable fish